The Aguçadoura Wave Farm was a wave farm located  offshore near Póvoa de Varzim north of Porto in Portugal. The farm was designed to use three Pelamis Wave Energy Converters to convert the motion of the ocean surface waves into electricity, totalling to 2.25 MW in total installed capacity. The farm was officially opened on 23 September 2008, by the Portuguese Minister of Economy. The wave farm was shut down two months after the official opening in November 2008.

Pelamis machines

Developed by the Scottish company Pelamis Wave Power, the Pelamis machine is made up of connected sections which flex and bend relative to one another as waves run along the structure. This motion is resisted by hydraulic rams which pump high pressure oil through hydraulic motors which in turn drive electrical generators. The three machines which made up the Aguçadoura Wave Park were each rated at a peak output of 750 kW, giving an installed peak capacity of 2.25 MW, enough to meet the average electricity demand of more than 1,500 Portuguese homes. The average output from a Pelamis machine will depend on the wave resource in a particular area. The higher the resource the higher the average output. According to information on the Pelamis web site, it appears that the average power output for a Pelamis wave machine is about 150 kW.

Project management 
The project was originally conceived by the Portuguese renewable energy company Enersis, which developed and financed the project and which was subsequently bought by the Australian infrastructure company Babcock & Brown in December 2005. In the last quarter of 2008, Babcock & Brown had its shares suspended and has been in a managed process of selling its assets, including the Aguçadoura project. In March 2009, Babcock & Brown went into voluntary administration.

In November 2008, the Pelamis machines were brought back to harbor at Leixões due to a technical problem with some of the bearings for which a solution has been found. However, the machines are likely to remain off-line until a new partner is found to take over Babcock & Brown’s 77% share in the project. This seems unlikely, because according to Pelamis "those machines are sub-optimal" and the owner is trying to sell them.
Pelamis subsequently focused its efforts on the new P2 machine, which was tested in Orkney in Scotland beginning in 2010. Pelamis ceased operations in 2014; the P2 device was dismantled in 2016.

See also 

 List of largest power stations in the world

References

External links 

 Pelamis Wave Power Limited
 Wave energy to power Portugal
 Video of a machine at youtube.com

Wave farms in Portugal